Raorchestes graminirupes is a species of frog in the family Rhacophoridae.
It is endemic to the Western Ghats, India.

Its natural habitats are subtropical or tropical high-altitude shrubland and subtropical or tropical high-altitude grassland.
It is threatened by habitat loss.

References

graminirupes
Frogs of India
Endemic fauna of the Western Ghats
Taxonomy articles created by Polbot
Amphibians described in 2005